Efrain Antonio Ramírez (born October 2, 1973) is an American actor and DJ, best known for playing Pedro Sánchez in the 2004 indie film Napoleon Dynamite. He later reprised his role in the 2012 animated series of the same name.

Early life
Ramírez was born in Los Angeles, California, to Salvadoran parents, both are from El Salvador. He has four brothers, one of whom is his identical twin Carlos.

Career
Ramirez has starred in a number of films, including Napoleon Dynamite as Pedro Sánchez, Employee of the Month with Dane Cook, Jessica Simpson, and Dax Shepard, Crank and Crank: High Voltage with Jason Statham, Searching for Mickey Fish with Daniel Baldwin, All You've Got with Ciara, and HBO's Walkout and made cameos in Nacho Libre and Mr. & Mrs. Smith. In 2009, Efren starred in the comedy American Summer with Matthew Lillard as well as appearing as a contestant on MTV's Celebrity Rap Superstar. On July 14, 2008 Sierra Mist released a series of commercials aimed at multicultural consumers in which Efren stars. The first being named "Wedding Girl" followed by "Mannequin Man" and an online spot, "The Whiner," which will be posted at the Sierra Mist dedicated site, RefreshYourMind.com

Soon after the success of Napoleon Dynamite, the music group G. Love and Special Sauce asked Efren to appear in their music video "Booty Call". He also played Ashlee Simpson's boyfriend in the music video for her 2005 song "Boyfriend". Ramírez made a cameo appearance in a 2005 episode of ABC's George López wearing a T-shirt similar to the shirt Jon Heder wears in Napoleon Dynamite that reads, "Vote For Pedro". In 2007 Ramírez appeared as the judge for an acting challenge on Cycle 8 of America's Next Top Model.

Ramírez made several cameos throughout his career. In King Cobra, he portrayed a teenager playing a game of hide-and-seek with his girlfriend (portrayed by Ramirez's wife Iyari Limon). They later end up as prey for the title antagonist. In the music video for Sleazy, Pedro appears as a cameo and lip syncs André 3000's verse.

He co-founded Powerhouse Pictures Entertainment, LLC with Chris Barrett, and they co-authored the book Direct Your Own Life: How To Be A Star in Any Field You Choose being published on June 10, 2008 through Kaplan Publishing.

Personal life
In 1998, Efren married actress Iyari Limon. The marriage was later annulled.

Ramírez is also a popular DJ, who has performed worldwide and toured in over 50 cities across 5 continents. His sets include a variety of music, from hip hop, funk, disco, to hard house. His production company "Nocturnal Rampage" throws a recurring rave event every summer in Austin.

Filmography

Film

Television

References

External links

1973 births
American people of Salvadoran descent
American male actors of Mexican descent
American male film actors
Hispanic and Latino American male actors
Male actors from Los Angeles
American twins
20th-century American male actors
21st-century American male actors
Living people